Mariam Imnadze (born 5 March 2001) is a Georgian swimmer.

In 2018, she competed in the women's 50 metre freestyle and women's 100 metre freestyle events at the 2018 FINA World Swimming Championships (25 m) held in Hangzhou, China. In both events she did not advance to compete in the semi-finals.

In 2019, she represented Georgia at the 2019 World Aquatics Championships held in Gwangju, South Korea. She competed in the women's 50 metre freestyle and women's 100 metre freestyle events. In both events she did not advance to compete in the semi-finals.

References 

Living people
2001 births
Place of birth missing (living people)
Female swimmers from Georgia (country)
Female freestyle swimmers from Georgia (country)